U.K. is the debut album by the progressive rock supergroup U.K., released in May 1978 through E.G. Records and Polydor Records. It features John Wetton, Eddie Jobson, Bill Bruford, and Allan Holdsworth. "In the Dead of Night" and "Mental Medication" were both edited for single release.  The album was well received by FM album rock radio and by the public during the summer of 1978.  The LP sold just over 250,000 copies by 1 September 1978, with further sales through the rest of the year. The album was remastered in 2016 and included as part of the box-set "Ultimate Collector's Edition".

Writing 
"Alaska" was written by Eddie Jobson for the Yamaha CS-80. The first three tracks belong to a suite entitled "In the Dead of Night", which began as a chord sequence by Jobson, to which Wetton added the melody and lyrics. Early versions of "In the Dead of Night" and "Thirty Years" were written before the formation of the band.

Legacy 
In 2015, Rolling Stone magazine ranked it as the 30th best progressive rock album of all time.

In an interview with the TeamRock site in 2016, Ty Tabor of King's X selected the album as his top pick in a "5 Essential Guitar Albums" list, stating, "I had never heard anybody think about playing guitar the way that [Holdsworth] plays on that record."

Track listing

Personnel 
U.K.
 Allan Holdsworth – acoustic & electric guitar
 Eddie Jobson – keyboards, electric violin, electronics
 John Wetton – bass, lead and backing vocals
 Bill Bruford – drums, percussion

Production
 Stephen W. Tayler – engineering, mixing

Singles 
 "In the Dead of Night" / "Mental Medication"

Chart positions

References 
Notes

References

U.K. (band) albums
1978 debut albums
E.G. Records albums
Albums recorded at Trident Studios